Herbert Roper Barrett, KC (24 November 1873 – 27 July 1943) was a tennis player from Great Britain.

Biography

Barrett was born on 24 November 1873 in Upton, Essex.

At the London Olympics in 1908 Barrett won a gold medal in the men's indoor doubles event with Arthur Gore.  They also won the doubles in Wimbledon in 1909. In 1912 and 1913 he won the Wimbledon doubles title with Charles Dixon.

He played his first Wimbledon singles' competition in 1898, reaching the second round in which he lost to eventual finalist Laurence Doherty. In 1908 he reached the All comers final, beating Anthony Wilding and Major Ritchie before losing in five sets to Arthur Gore. In 1909 he beat James Cecil Parke and Friedrich Rahe before losing to Ritchie in the all comers final. He achieved his best Wimbledon singles result in 1911 when he beat Parke and Gordon Lowe before winning the All-Comers final against compatriot Charles P. Dixon. In the Challenge Round against Anthony Wilding from New Zealand, Roper Barrett had to retire at the start of the fifth set. Over the following years he would make regular appearances at Wimbledon until his final participation in 1921.

He participated in the first Davis Cup in 1900 and was the non-playing captain of the winning British Davis Cup team in 1933.

His most successful tournament wins were at the Suffolk Championships at Saxmundham which he won 17 times between 1898 and 1921, he reached 18 finals there and won the tournament 14 consecutive times between 1904 and 1921 all three values are all-time records at a single tournament. He won the Essex Championships 13 times (1897-1898, 1899, 1901, 1906, 1908, 1910, 1912), and also won the East of England Championships 6 times (1897-1899, 1901-1902, 1910). He died on 27 July 1943.

Grand Slam finals

Singles (2 runner-ups)

Doubles (3 titles, 3 runner-ups)

References

External links
 
 
 
 
 
 Olympics.org medals overview 
 Times Obituary

1873 births
1943 deaths
19th-century male tennis players
English King's Counsel
English lawyers
English male tennis players
English Olympic medallists
Olympic gold medallists for Great Britain
Olympic silver medallists for Great Britain
Olympic tennis players of Great Britain
People from West Ham
Tennis players at the 1908 Summer Olympics
Tennis players at the 1912 Summer Olympics
Wimbledon champions (pre-Open Era)
Olympic medalists in tennis
Grand Slam (tennis) champions in men's doubles
Medalists at the 1908 Summer Olympics
Medalists at the 1912 Summer Olympics
British male tennis players
Tennis people from Greater London